The Foundation Cup was a rugby league match contested annually in the National Rugby League between the Sydney Roosters and the Wests Tigers. The Foundation Cup was introduced in 2007 to celebrate the foundation of rugby league in Australia.

Results

See also

References

External links

Sydney Roosters
Wests Tigers
Rugby league competitions in New South Wales
Rugby league in Sydney
Rugby league rivalries
2007 establishments in Australia
Recurring sporting events established in 2007
Sports rivalries in Australia
2013 disestablishments in Australia
Recurring sporting events disestablished in 2013